The 2013–14 season was Motherwell's twenty ninth consecutive season in the top flight of Scottish football and the first in the newly established Scottish Premiership, having been promoted from the Scottish First Division at the end of the 1984–85 season. They finished the season in second place, behind Celtic, earning entry to the Europa League again, having been knocked out of the 2013–14 seasons at the Third Qualifying Round stage by FC Kuban Krasnodar. They also competed in the League Cup, reaching the Quarter-Final, and the Scottish Cup where they reached the Fourth Round.

Results and fixtures

Pre-season friendlies

Scottish Premiership

Results

UEFA Europa League

Qualifying phase

Scottish Cup

Scottish League Cup

Squad statistics

Appearances

|-
|}

Top scorers

Disciplinary record

League table

Results summary

Results by round

Results by opponent
Motherwell score first

Source: 2013–14 Scottish Premier League Results Table

Transfers

In

Out

Loans in

Loans out

Released

See also
 List of Motherwell F.C. seasons

Notes and references

External links
 Motherwell F.C. Website
 BBC My Club Page
 Motherwell F.C. Newsnow

Motherwell F.C. seasons
Motherwell F.C.
Motherwell